Tadatomo (written: 忠友, 忠朝 or 忠智) is a masculine Japanese given name. Notable people with the name include:

, Japanese samurai
, Japanese samurai
, Japanese daimyō
, Japanese politician

Japanese masculine given names